Danny Noonan (born 29 November 1968) is a former Australian rules footballer who played with the Brisbane Bears in the Australian Football League (AFL) during the early 1990s. He also spent time in Tasmania with Tasmanian Football League (TFL) club Clarence and was an interstate representative for Tasmania.

Football career
Noonan, from Mooroolbark, was a reserves footballer at Carlton as a youngster but he left without making a senior appearance. He joined Clarence, playing his first TFL season in 1988 and winning their Best and Fairest award in 1990.

Brisbane recruited Noonan to the AFL with a pre-draft selection in 1990. A utility, he had 31 disposals in his debut game and played at Brisbane for three seasons before returning to Clarence.

In his second stint at Clarence he won two further Best and Fairests as well as back to back William Leitch Medals in 1995 and 1996. His 1995 medal caused a great divide and contention in the state and indeed the league when he was caught on camera deliberately king hitting superstar North Launceston on-baller Marcus Todman during the grand final.

His last TFL game was a premiership, with a Darrel Baldock Medal winning performance in the 1997 Grand Final win against Burnie.

Post football career
After his football career Noonan became a financial planner. In 2017 he pleaded guilty to 107 counts of fraudulently misappropriating, or stealing, $2.5 million from clients of his financial planning company to fund his gambling addiction. He was sentenced to six-and-a-half years in jail with a minimum sentence of just over three years.

References

External links

1968 births
Living people
Australian rules footballers from Melbourne
Brisbane Bears players
William Leitch Medal winners
Clarence Football Club players
Tasmanian State of Origin players
Tasmanian Football Hall of Fame inductees
People from Mooroolbark, Victoria